State Route 135 (SR 135) is a north–south secondary state highway located in eastern Middle Tennessee. it originates in White County along SR 289 on the north side of Sparta, and its northern end is in Clay County along SR 52.

Route description

White County

SR 135 begins on the north side of Sparta at an intersection with SR 289 (Old SR 111) in White County. It goes north along the former alignment of SR 111 before crossing it and having an interchange. SR 135 goes northwest through Bakers Crossroads, where it has an intersection with SR 136 before entering Putnam County.

Putnam County

SR 135 winds its way north and east, where it passes by Burgess Falls State Park, before having an interchange with I-40 (Exit 286) and entering the city of Cookeville. SR 135 passes through some commercial areas before entering downtown, where it has an intersection with US 70N/SR 24. SR 135 then leaves downtown and has an intersection with SR 290 before traveling northward through rural areas into Jackson County.

Jackson County

SR 135 has an intersection with SR 477 and passes through Dodson Branch before it becomes extremely curvy as it winds its way north then west to enter Gainesboro to intersect and become concurrent with SR 53 and SR 85 at a y-intersection. They then come to an intersection with SR 56 just north of downtown, where SR 85 and SR 135 turn north along SR 56. They then cross the Cumberland River to leave Gainesboro and continue north to Jennings Creek, where SR 85 splits off and goes west. They then enter Whitleyville and SR 135 splits off from SR 56 and turns north at a y-intersection. SR 135 becomes curvy again as it passes through rugged terrain before crossing into Clay County.

Clay County

SR 135 winds its way north through the mountains before entering farmland and reaching its northern terminus along SR 52 in western Clay County between Hermitage Springs and Moss.

Major intersections

References 

135
135
135
135
135